TCPO, or bis(2,4,6-trichlorophenyl) oxalate

Uses
When combined with a fluorescent dye like 9,10-bis(phenylethynyl)anthracene, a solvent (such as diethyl phthalate), and a weak base (usually sodium acetate or sodium salicylate), and hydrogen peroxide, the mixture will start a chemiluminescent reaction to glow a fluorescent green color.

Red, yellow and blue colors can be made by replacing the 9,10-bis(phenylethynyl)anthracene with rhodamine B, rubrene and 9,10-diphenylanthracene respectively.

The above Fluorescent dyes absorb much of the energy produced during the decomposition of the oxalate ester, and convert that energy into light energy which is observed as the characteristic glow in products such as glowsticks.

Preparation
TCPO can be prepared from a solution of 2,4,6-trichlorophenol in a solution of dry toluene by reaction with oxalyl chloride in the presence of a base such as triethylamine.  This method produces crude TCPO with a by-product of triethylamine hydrochloride.
The triethylamine hydrochloride can be dissolved in water, methanol or ethanol, so the product is more purified. After washing it can be recrystallized from ethyl acetate.

See also
 Bis(2,4,5-trichlorophenyl-6-carbopentoxyphenyl)oxalate (CPPO)
 MCPO

References

Chlorobenzenes
Oxalate esters
Phenol esters
Chemiluminescence